Kanade is a surname. Notable people with the surname include:

Mihir Kanade, Indian author and professor of international law and human rights
Takeo Kanade (born 1945), Japanese computer scientist
Kranti Kanade, Indian filmmaker

See also 
Kanade–Lucas–Tomasi feature tracker, is an approach to feature extraction in computer vision
Lucas–Kanade method, is a widely used differential method for optical flow in computer vision
Tomasi–Kanade factorization, is the seminal work by Carlo Tomasi and Takeo Kanade in the early 1990s